This article shows statistics of individual players for the football club Dinamo Zagreb. It also lists all matches that Dinamo Zagreb played in the 2012–13 season.

First-team squad

First team squad

Competitions

Overall

Prva HNL

League table

Results summary

Results by round

Champions league

Group A

Matches

Prva HNL

Champions League

Croatian Cup

Sources: Prva-HNL.hr

Player seasonal records
Competitive matches only. Updated to games played 27 April 2013.

Top scorers

Source: Competitive matches

References

External links
GNK Dinamo Zagreb official website

2012-13
Croatian football clubs 2012–13 season
2012–13 UEFA Champions League participants seasons
2012-13